The Roman–Jewish Treaty  was an agreement made between Judas Maccabeus and the Roman Republic according to  and Josephus. It took place in 161 BCE and was the first recorded contract between the Jewish people and the Romans.

Context
The treaty was signed during the Maccabean Revolt against the Greco-Syrian Seleucid kingdom.  During this period, Rome's power and influence in the Hellenistic world was growing. Rome had recently humiliated the Seleucid King Antiochus IV by ordering his troops to leave Egypt, and had previously defeated his father Antiochus III in battle. After winning a number of victories and capturing Jerusalem, Judas Maccabeus sent two emissaries, Eupolemus son of John son of Accos and Jason son of Eleazar, to establish a treaty of friendship with the Roman Senate. This proposal was accepted and a treaty was signed.

Content
In I Maccabees, the treaty is preceded by several paragraphs of introduction which praise the Romans for their great strength and their unique system of government. The clauses of the treaty require each party to aid the other if it is attacked, and to refrain from helping the enemies of the other party. The treaty also contains an assurance by the Romans that they have told the Seleucid King Demetrius I not to attack the Jews.

Text
According to I Maccabees chapter 8:

May all go well with the Romans and with the nation of the Jews at sea and on land forever, and may sword and enemy be far from them. If war comes first to Rome or to any of their allies in all their dominion, the nation of the Jews shall act as their allies wholeheartedly, as the occasion may indicate to them. To the enemy that makes war they shall not give or supply grain, arms, money, or ships, just as Rome has decided; and they shall keep their obligations without receiving any return. In the same way, if war comes first to the nation of the Jews, the Romans shall willingly act as their allies, as the occasion may indicate to them. And to their enemies there shall not be given grain, arms, money, or ships, just as Rome has decided; and they shall keep these obligations and do so without deceit. Thus on these terms the Romans make a treaty with the Jewish people. If after these terms are in effect both parties shall determine to add or delete anything, they shall do so at their discretion, and any addition or deletion that they may make shall be valid. Concerning the wrongs that King Demetrius is doing to them, we have written to him as follows:, 'Why have you made your yoke heavy on our friends and allies the Jews? If now they appeal again for help against you, we will defend their rights and fight you on sea and on land.'

Authenticity
The first mention of friendship between the Romans and the Jews in Graeco-Roman sources is to be found in Justinus' summary of a 44-volume work no longer extant called the Liber Historiarum Philippicarum et totius mundi origines et terrae situs by Pompeius Trogus, written during the Augustan Principate. In it, he writes: A Demetrio cum desciuissent, amicitia Romanorum petita primi omnium ex orientalibus libertatem acceperunt. [36.3.9] Justinus writes, "On revolting from Demetrius, and soliciting the friendship of the Romans, they were the first of all the eastern people that regained their liberty". Other ancient writers corroborate that the diplomatic relations at this time were in the form of amicitia. Among these may be included Josephus (B.J. 1.38), Justinus (36.3.9), Eusebius (Ol. 155/1, p. 126 Schoene) and Jerome (Chron. p. 141, b, 1.23 ff. Helm). On the basis of these passages, Herzfeld in 1863 determined that the Jews entered into a treaty of friendship with the Romans.

Mirabilia Urbis Romae, a popular medieval guidebook to Rome for the use of Christian pilgrims, mentions that the Greek church of San Basilio should be visited solely on account of a bronze tablet that had once been affixed to its wall. The Mirabilia in chapter 24 reports: in muro S. Basilio fuit magna tabula aenea, ubi fuit scripta amicitia in loco bono et notabili, quae fuit inter Romanos et Iudaeos tempore Iudae Machabaei. Attached to the wall of [the church of] San Basilio was a large bronze tablet where there was written, in a suitable and conspicuous place, friendship between the Romans and the Jews in the time of Judas Maccabaeus.

The Israeli scholar Dov Gera notes the similarity in form between the Roman-Jewish treaty and other comparable agreements, arguing that it really was signed.

See also
 Hasmonean
 List of treaties

References
 
 I Maccabees: Chapter 8.
 Josephus. Antiquities of the Jews, bk.13, ch.9 v.2
 Gera, Dov. (1998). Judea in Mediterranean Politics 219-161 B.C.. Leiden: Brill.

Specific

Books of the Maccabees
Jews and Judaism in the Roman Republic
Treaties of the Roman Republic
2nd-century BC treaties
2nd century BC in the Roman Republic
Treaties with indigenous peoples